Tulipa orphanidea  is a species of flowering plant in the Liliaceae family. It was described by Pierre Edmond Boissier and Theodor Heinrich Hermann von Heldreich (1862).

Description 

Tulipa orphanidea is a bulbous perennial reaching 10–20 cm in height. Bulbs measure 20–47 x 8–22 mm. The stem is glabrous or hairy, and the leaves which vary from 2–7 reach a size of about 20x2 cm, and are green, often with a tinge of red along their edges. The stem bears 1–4 globular to star-shaped flowers with copper-red, rarely yellow and red tepals, arranged in two whorls of three. The tepals bear a black, sometimes yellow, basal blotch interiorly. The outer tepals measure 3–6 × 1–1.8 cm and the inner tepal 3–6 × 1.2–2.1 cm. The six stamens are a dark olive colour, 7–12 mm in length. The chromosome number is 2n = 36, rarely 24 or 48.

Taxonomy 
The taxonomy is complex, since it is a variable population. It is placed in subgenus Eriostemones, one of four subgenera of Tulipa. The species has at various times been treated as a variable taxon with a range of forms, divided into subspecies, including T. o. whittalii, or as a number of different discrete species, including T. bithynica, T. hageri and T. whittallii.

Distribution and habitat 
Tulipa orphanidea is found in the southeast Balkans, Bulgaria, Greece, Aegean Islands, Crete and western Turkey. Its habitat includes black pine (Pinus nigra) forests, fields and roadsides, at altitudes up to 1,700 m.

Ecology 
Tulipa orphanidea blooms from April to May.

Cultivation 
Tulipa orphanidea has been used s an ornamental garden plant since 1861. Different colour forms are stable in cultivation and various cultivars have been developed, and given Cultivar Group names such as T. orphanidea Hageri Group and Whittallii Group. Cultivars include T. orphanidea Hageri Group ‘Splendens’.

The Whittallii Group, with burnt orange inner tepals and a black blotch at the base of each tepal, has received the Royal Horticultural Society's Award of Garden Merit.

References

Bibliography 

 , In

External links 

orphanidea
Taxa named by Pierre Edmond Boissier
Taxa named by Theodor von Heldreich